Daniel Rayne Kruger  (born 23 October 1974) is a British Conservative Party politician who has been the Member of Parliament (MP) for Devizes in Wiltshire since 2019.

The son of writer and property developer Rayne Kruger and restaurateur and television presenter Prue Leith, Kruger was educated at Eton College, subsequently studying history at the University of Edinburgh and University of Oxford. After university, he worked at the Centre for Policy Studies think tank, and then became a policy adviser for the Conservative Party.

Kruger became David Cameron's chief speechwriter in 2006. He left this role two years later to work full-time at a youth crime prevention charity that he had co-founded called Only Connect. For his charitable work, Kruger received an MBE in 2017. He was Prime Minister Boris Johnson's political secretary between August and December 2019.

Early life and career
Kruger was born in Westminster to South African parents, writer and property developer Rayne Kruger, and restaurateur and television presenter Prue Leith. He was privately educated at Eton College. Kruger studied history at the University of Edinburgh. While at the university, he was the editor of the magazine Intercourse, which had a controversial issue featuring three naked students and an advertisement for a massage parlour. He obtained a doctorate in history from the University of Oxford in 2000.

After university, he became the director of research at the centre-right think tank Centre for Policy Studies in 2001. Kruger worked as a policy adviser in the Conservative Party's Policy Unit from 2003 to 2005. During this time, he was credited with contributing to then Conservative Party leader Iain Duncan Smith's speech at the 2003 Conservative Party Conference. In 2005, Kruger became the chief leader writer of The Daily Telegraph.

Kruger was selected as the Conservative candidate for Sedgefield at the 2005 general election, challenging prime minister Tony Blair in the seat. He was forced to drop out of the contest, however, after The Guardian quoted him stating that the party had planned "to introduce a period of creative destruction in the public services". Kruger left his position at The Daily Telegraph to become the chief speechwriter to then Conservative Party leader David Cameron in 2006. He wrote Cameron's 2006 address to the think-tank Centre for Social Justice, which was later dubbed the "hug-a-hoodie" speech, and was noted as a call to re-brand the party with compassionate conservatism at its core.

He co-founded the London-based youth crime prevention charity Only Connect in 2006 and in 2008 left his position as Cameron's chief speechwriter to work full-time for the charity. In 2015, the charity was acquired by Catch22 but continued to operate independently with its own brand. He also founded the charity West London Zone, which aims to provide support to at-risk youth. Kruger was made an MBE for services to charity in the 2017 Queen's Birthday Honours. In the same year, he voiced his support for the legalisation of cannabis.

Kruger supported Brexit in the 2016 UK EU membership referendum. He was a senior fellow at the pro-Brexit think-tank Legatum Institute, which he left in 2018 to become an adviser at the Department for Digital, Culture, Media and Sport. In August 2019, Kruger became the political secretary to Prime Minister Boris Johnson.

Parliamentary career
Kruger was selected as a parliamentary candidate for the safe Conservative seat of Devizes on 9 November 2019. The constituency's incumbent Conservative MP, Claire Perry O'Neill, had previously announced that she would be standing down at the next election to become the president of the 2020 United Nations Climate Change Conference, and spend more time with her family; she was later fired from that role by Prime Minister Boris Johnson on 31 January 2020 for unspecified reasons. Kruger was elected as MP for Devizes in the 2019 general election, with a majority of 23,993 (47.1%). After the election, he was replaced as political secretary to the PM by Ben Gascoigne. He made his maiden speech on 29 January 2020, in which he called for a return to Christian values.

In May 2020 he tweeted extensively in support of the apparent breach of lockdown by Dominic Cummings and Mary Wakefield, describing them as "old friends".

In August 2020 Kruger was photographed breaching the rules on the mandatory wearing of masks on public transport. He apologised and stated that he "simply forgot", but also criticised the photographer for not asking him to put on a mask. He has also referred to his dislike for "absurd masks" in an interview with local media.

In May 2021 Kruger wrote an essay entitled "Restoring Rights, Reclaiming Liberty" for inclusion in Common Sense: Conservative Thinking for a Post-Liberal Age published by the Common Sense Group, an informal group of Conservative MPs. He was appointed as a Parliamentary Private Secretary in the Department for Levelling Up, Housing and Communities in September 2021.

In June 2022, Kruger supported Prime Minister Boris Johnson in the 2022 Conservative Party vote of confidence in his leadership, saying "I don't judge people's private morals, or rather I do but I oughtn't. I judge public conduct. And on that, I think we should be forgiving about minor slips". In the same month, while speaking during a debate on the overturning of Roe v. Wade by the Supreme Court of the United States which resulted in the removal of pregnant women's constitutional right to abortion, he commented that he did not agree "that women have an absolute right to bodily autonomy" in relation to abortion as "in the case of abortion that right is qualified by the fact that another body is involved".

On 6 July 2022, as part of the crisis of confidence in Boris Johnson of 2022, Kruger resigned as Parliamentary Private Secretary to the Department for Levelling Up, Housing and Communities.

Kruger endorsed Suella Braverman during the July 2022 Conservative Party leadership election.

Personal life
Kruger is married to Emma, a former teacher. They are both co-founders of the charity Only Connect. He is an evangelical Christian. He was fined after his puppy caused a stampede when it chased a 200-strong herd of deer in London's Richmond Park in March 2021. Kruger apologised and said he would be more careful in future.

In 2020–2021 he submitted the highest energy bill claim of any Westminster MP.

References

External links 

1974 births
Living people
Conservative Party (UK) MPs for English constituencies
UK MPs 2019–present
People educated at Eton College
Alumni of the University of Edinburgh
Alumni of the University of Oxford
Members of the Order of the British Empire
Danny
People from Westminster